The United Consultants Twin Bee is an American twin-engined light amphibious aircraft of the 1960s.

Development

The Republic Seabee was built between 1946 and 1948, with over 1000 aircraft being sold. The type was rather underpowered and many were later fitted with more powerful engines than the  Franklin 6A8 originally fitted.

In 1960, former Helio company engineer Joseph W. Gigante (1916-2012) designed a twin-engine conversion of the Sea Bee and founded United Consultants Corp in Norwood, Massachusetts, to undertake the manufacturing work on the UC-1 Twin Bee.

The first aircraft flew in 1962 and the type certificate was awarded on 25 June 1965. 23 production examples were delivered between 1965 and 1987.

The UC-1 is a major conversion of the RC-3 Seabee airframe. The single pusher engine is deleted and this allows an additional fifth seat to be fitted beneath the old installation. The twin  Lycoming engines, mounted in tractor configuration, are fitted in the wing, fairly close to the cabin. This required the rear cabin windows to be reduced in size, supplemented by a porthole-type window each side of the rear of the enlarged cabin.

The rights to the UC-1 design were transferred to the STOL Aircraft Corporation. J.W. Gigante advertised the rights for sale during September 2006.

Operational history
The considerable extra engine power of Twin Bee proved to be attractive to private owners, as the aircraft has STOL takeoff and landing ability. 15 of the 23 conversions were currently registered in the United States in April 2009. Other examples are active in Switzerland and the Philippines.

Specifications

See also

References
Notes

Bibliography

External links

 Narrative about the Twin Bee
 Information and images of Twin Bees

1960s United States civil utility aircraft
Amphibious aircraft
Twin Bee
High-wing aircraft
Aircraft first flown in 1962
Flying boats
Twin piston-engined tractor aircraft